Partial legislative elections were held in Belgium on 12 June 1843. In the Senate elections Catholics won 32 seats and Liberals 13. Voter turnout was 86.0%, although only 21,865 people were eligible to vote.

Under the alternating system, Chamber elections were only held in four out of the nine provinces: East Flanders, Hainaut, Liège and Limburg. Thus, 47 of the 95 Chamber seats were up for election.

Results

Senate

References

1840s elections in Belgium
General
Belgium